Flying By is a 2009 drama film directed by Jim Amatulli and starring Billy Ray Cyrus, Heather Locklear, Olesya Rulin, and Patricia Neal. It was the final film for Patricia Neal.

Plot
A real estate developer goes to his 25th high school reunion without his wife, and finds his old teenage band playing. They get him up on stage for a couple of songs, and convince him come to a rehearsal. His wife is outraged that he played. His daughter thinks it's kind of cool. His mother, in a retirement home, encourages him to enjoy life. He feels some temporary relief from the pressures of business complexities and the stress of marriage tensions. The band gets booked at a popular bar, which leads to a last minute booking to open for a reunion tour, with the possibility of additional tour dates. But the band has internal conflicts. He faces a tough decision to give it a shot even though it will affect his marriage, his family, particularly his daughter, and his business.

Notable cast
 Billy Ray Cyrus as George Barron
 Heather Locklear as Pamela
 Olesya Rulin as Ellie
 Patricia Neal as Margie
 Eric Allan Kramer as Steve
David Haack as Alan

References

External links
 

2009 television films
2009 films
American drama television films
2009 drama films
2000s English-language films